Salaq-e Yasi Tappeh (also Romanized as Salāq-e Yāsī Tappeh; also known as Salāq-e Yās Tappeh) is a village in Bagheli-ye Marama Rural District, in the Central District of Gonbad-e Qabus County, Golestan Province, Iran. At the 2006 census, its population was 778, in 169 families.

References 

Populated places in Gonbad-e Kavus County